L'anatra all'arancia (internationally released as Duck in Orange Sauce) is a 1975 Italian comedy film based upon the play by William Douglas-Home and Marc-Gilbert Sauvajon. It was directed by Luciano Salce. For this film Monica Vitti was awarded with a David di Donatello for Best Actress and with a Silver Ribbon in the same category. The film is named for the culinary dish, Duck à l'orange.

Cast 
Ugo Tognazzi as Livio Stefani
Monica Vitti as  Lisa Stefani, wife of Livio
Barbara Bouchet as  Patty, secretary and lover of Livio
John Richardson as  Jean-Claude, lover of Lisa
Antonio Allocca as  Carmine
Sabina De Guida as  Cecilia 
Tom Felleghy as Livio's colleague

References

External links

1975 films
Films directed by Luciano Salce
Films scored by Armando Trovajoli
Italian comedy films
Adultery in films
Films set in Rome
1975 comedy films
1970s Italian films